Ze světa lesních samot is a Czech novel, written by Karel Klostermann. It was first published in 1891.

1891 Czech novels